Frequently Asked Questions About Time Travel (stylised as FAQ About Time Travel) is a 2009 British comedy science fiction film directed by Gareth Carrivick from a script by Jamie Mathieson, starring Chris O'Dowd, Dean Lennox Kelly, Marc Wootton and Anna Faris.

The film follows two avid science fiction fans (O'Dowd and Wootton) and their snarky mate (Kelly) as they attempt to navigate a time travel conundrum in the middle of a British pub, where they meet a girl from the future (Faris) who sets the adventure in motion.

It was released in the UK and Ireland on 24 April 2009. On its television premiere on BBC Two on 1 August 2010, the film was dedicated to its director Gareth Carrivick, who had died a month before the film's release.

Plot

Ray (Chris O'Dowd) has been fired from his job as a costumed guide in a theme park attraction. That evening, Ray and his friends Pete (Dean Lennox Kelly) and Toby (Marc Wootton) go to the cinema, later complaining about the film on their way to the pub.

At the pub, they compose a "Letter to Hollywood" with tips on how to stop making bad movies, on the back of a sheet from Toby's "brilliant ideas" notebook. Ray meets an American girl named Cassie (Anna Faris), with dark brown hair, who claims to be a member of a future organisation that fixes "time leaks", who warns Ray about "Editors": people who travel in time to kill famous artists immediately after they've created their greatest work, to avoid a later decline in quality. Cassie tells Ray that future books will be written about him, and refers to him as "Ray the Great". Ray assumes that his friends have set him up with Cassie to make him feel better after losing his job, and after a brief conversation Cassie leaves. When Ray relates this entire story to Pete and Toby, they think he's invented the entire encounter.

Pete leaves them to use the "Gents" toilet, but when he returns the bar is full of dead bodies, among them a bearded version of himself. At first he hides back in the toilet, but when he re-enters the room it has returned to normal. He tells his friends what happened, assuming it must be related to Cassie's time leaks. Ray assumes that his friends are trying to take his mind off losing his job. 

The three of them jump 30 minutes back in time and find their earlier selves, just finishing the composition of their "Letter to Hollywood." Ray realizes that Cassie is still there, talking to an earlier version of himself. He stops her before she leaves, explaining that they found the time leak in the men's toilet. She returns one second later, with a different hairstyle, having spent six months rectifying the time leak. Cassie claims everything has been fixed, but when a couple enter the garden ahead of schedule she leaves to investigate.

Pete, Ray, and Toby assume everything is resolved, but when they leave the toilet they find themselves in a post-apocalyptic version of the pub. Pete decides to flee back into the women's toilet again, but emerges from the door of the men's toilet, bearded, filthy and traumatised. He repeatedly insists that that he doesn't want to talk about his experiences, but later describes some of the things he's seen and been through. Strange sounds cause them to run for the toilet again, so that they miss seeing a building-sized ant eat a man, who is pushing a shopping trolley with a loud squeaky wheel.

Ray and Toby try to stop Pete from warning earlier versions of themselves, and creating a paradox that will make them cease to exist. When he runs out after one solo version of himself, they follow him out into a themed-night party at the pub. An earlier version of Toby is discovered writing in a page of his notebook, and they reason that whatever was on the other side of that piece of paper is how they became famous. In the crowd at the party they meet a second time traveller named Millie (Meredith MacNeill), who claims that she trained Cassie and that she was sent by Cassie to take them back to their own time.

Back at their table in the pub, they read what was on the back of the piece of paper, although the contents are not disclosed to the viewers. They express wonderment at the idea that it could have made them famous, and decide that the paper must have been found there by someone. Ray finds Cassie outside, for whom another six months have passed. She tells Ray tells that Millie was sent to kill them at their finest hour. He goes back inside to warn Pete and Toby while Cassie tries to get help, but she finds that her time machine has been taken offline and she follows him in. Ray and Pete want to destroy the paper, so that Millie has no reason to kill them, but Toby is hesitant to give up their future fame. Millie arrives, incapacitates Cassie and promises Toby that she'll make them all legends in return for the piece of paper. He refuses, and as they try to destroy the paper Millie seemingly kills everyone in the pub. She leaves, with the piece of paper sitting on top of Ray, Toby and Pete's table.

An earlier version of Pete enters the bar, sees the bodies, and flees the room in horror. Just then, the bloodied Ray knocks over a pint of beer on to the piece of paper, destroying it. Time is shown reversing and resetting itself, until all three are sitting back at their table in the pub, from before any of the time travel happened, but with a full recollection of events. The piece of paper, now illegible, remains on their table. They decide to go to a different pub.

As they walk down a path towards a railway arch, Ray tells Pete that it's probably all over, because now that the page is destroyed none of the night's events should have ever happened. Moments later Cassie appears through a big glowing portal, with long golden-blonde hair. She reveals that she and Ray have been dating for two years - confirming they've had plenty of sex in that time - and that dumping the pint in the pub caused a feedback loop through the fabric of space-time resulting in time leaks everywhere. She says they have only fourteen hours to save the earth (a reference to the film Flash Gordon), and urges them to accompany her to a parallel universe. Ray eventually talks a reluctant Pete and Toby into going with him through the portal.

In a mid-credits scene, Ray emerges from behind a wall with Pete. Ray says that it appears the earlier versions of them have gone. However when Pete tells Toby he can come out, a second Pete emerges instead. In an end-credits scene, two Tobys pass by Ray and the two Petes, one fleeing from the other, with one of the Petes remarking: “This is all getting a little bit too complicated.”

Cast
 Chris O'Dowd as Ray
 Dean Lennox Kelly as Pete
 Marc Wootton as Toby
 Anna Faris as Cassie
 Meredith MacNeill as Millie

Home media

The DVD was released on 7 September 2009 in the UK. The film was also released DTV by HBO.

Production
The film is a co-production between HBO Films and BBC Films. It was filmed at Pinewood Studios in the UK. The credits of the film include thanks to "The Wheatsheaf Pub".

Design
The opening credits appear in outline block letters in light blue against the background of space, in the same style as the Superman films.

Many of the promotional items for this movie feature a stylized image from the film, of the male leads, standing in a similar pose to Michael J. Fox and Christopher Lloyd in posters from the Back to the Future franchise.

Reception
Critical reception has been mixed. , the film holds a 35% approval rating on review aggregator Rotten Tomatoes, based on 20 reviews.

Empire magazine concludes "Quirky and engaging with a script that keeps you on the ride." The review for the Daily Mirror's verdict was: "This engaging comedy feels like a stretched-out TV pilot, but is nicely put together, with enough laughs to make a refreshing change from usual Brit film fare."

The Irish Times described it as a "mildly diverting yarn" but was critical of the small scale of the film and the apparently limited budget. Peter Bradshaw reviewed the film for The Guardian and said that it was "the worst film of the week, a dire British comedy, to which the only honest response is to soil and then set fire to the Union flag in the foyer of your local cinema."

Soundtrack

 "Kayleigh" - performed by The Countdown Singers
 "Slippin' and Slidin'" - performed by Rendle
 "Flea Circus" - performed by Marder
 "Geno" - performed by The Countdown Singers
 "The Land of Make Believe" - performed by Bucks Fizz
 "Rivers of Babylon" - performed by Boney M
 "Total Eclipse of the Heart" - performed by Bonnie Tyler
 "Magic" - performed by The Countdown Singers
 "The Final Countdown" - performed by Eskimo Disco
 "Humans" - performed by Ry Byron & The Gentlemen

References

External links
 
 
 

2009 films
British science fiction comedy films
2000s science fiction comedy films
Films about time travel
Films scored by James L. Venable
Films with screenplays by Jamie Mathieson
2000s English-language films
2000s British films